The Crick, Brenner et al. experiment (1961) was a scientific experiment performed by Francis Crick, Sydney Brenner, Leslie Barnett and R.J. Watts-Tobin.
It was a key experiment in the development of what is now known as molecular biology and led to a publication entitled "The General Nature of the Genetic Code for Proteins" and according to the historian of Science Horace Judson is "regarded...as a classic of intellectual clarity, precision and rigour".    This study demonstrated that the genetic code is made up of a series of three base pair codons which code for individual amino acids. The experiment also elucidated the nature of gene expression and frame-shift mutations.

The experiment

In the experiment, proflavin-induced mutations of the T4 bacteriophage gene, rIIB, were isolated. Proflavin causes mutations by inserting itself between DNA bases, typically resulting in insertion or deletion of a single base pair.

Through the use of proflavin, the experimenters were able to insert or delete base pairs into their sequence of interest. When nucleotides were inserted or deleted, the gene would often be nonfunctional. However, if three base pairs were added or deleted, the gene would remain functional. This proved that the genetic code uses a codon of three nucleotide bases that corresponds to an amino acid. The mutants produced by Crick and Brenner that could not produce functional rIIB protein were the results of frameshift mutations, where the triplet code was disrupted.

Brenner and Crick et al. were also able to correct their frameshift mutations through the use of proflavin. If they had a nonfunctional gene due to a deleted base pair, by inserting a base pair into the general area of the deleted one, they were able to rescue the function of the gene. This is because the bases were shifted back into the correct reading frame.

Implications

This demonstration of the triplet nature of the genetic code, although carried out with bacteriophage, later proved to be universally applicable to all forms of life.

The results of this experiment inspired many to begin decoding the triplet code discovered by Brenner and Crick et al. Once this paper was published in 1961, researchers knew that there are 64 possible triplet codons, since there are four nitrogenous bases (4 x 4 x 4 = 64). Today, scientists have decoded what all 64 codons encode for, and the assignments have proven to be nearly universal.

See also
Nirenberg and Leder experiment
Nirenberg and Matthaei experiment

Notes

References

Sydney Brenner (Author), Lewis Wolpert (Contributor), Errorl C. Friedberg (Contributor), Eleanor Lawrence (Contributor) 2001 My Life in Science: Sydney Brenner, A Life in Science 2001 Biomed Central Ltd (publisher)   
Horace Freedland Judson (Author) 1979 The Eighth Day of Creation 1979 Johnathan Cape (publisher)   

Crick, Brenner et al. experiment, The
1961 in biology